Steve Wijler (born 19 September 1996) is a Dutch archer competing in men's recurve events. He won the bronze medal in the men's individual recurve event at the 2017 World Archery Championships held in Mexico City, Mexico. In 2021, Wijler and Gabriela Schloesser won the silver medal in the mixed team event at the 2020 Summer Olympics in Tokyo, Japan.

Career 

In 2018, he won the gold medal in the men's team event at the World Indoor Archery Championships held in Yankton, United States. At the 2018 European Archery Championships in Legnica, Poland, he won the gold medal in the men's individual recurve event.

He represented the Netherlands at the 2019 European Games held in Minsk, Belarus and he won the silver medal in both the individual recurve and team recurve events.

In 2021, he won the gold medal in the men's team recurve event at the European Archery Championships held in Antalya, Turkey. He also won the silver medal at the 2020 Summer Olympics in Tokyo, Japan in the mixed team event. He also competed in the men's individual and men's team events. Two months later, he competed at the 2021 World Archery Championships held in Yankton, United States.

In 2022, he won the men's recurve event at the Dutch National Indoor Archery Championships.

References

External links 

 

Living people
1996 births
Place of birth missing (living people)
Dutch male archers
European Games medalists in archery
European Games silver medalists for the Netherlands
Archers at the 2019 European Games
World Archery Championships medalists
Olympic archers of the Netherlands
Archers at the 2020 Summer Olympics
Olympic silver medalists for the Netherlands
Medalists at the 2020 Summer Olympics
Olympic medalists in archery
20th-century Dutch people
21st-century Dutch people